William Montgomerie Fleming (19 May 1874 – 24 July 1961) was an Australian politician, who served in the Australian House of Representatives and the New South Wales Legislative Assembly.

Early life 
Born in Avon Plains, Victoria to Scottish migrant and station manager John Fleming and his wife Helen (née Hastie), Fleming moved with his family to a farm near Walgett, New South Wales in 1882. Educated on the farm, private schools (including Cooerwull Academy) and at the University of Sydney, Fleming worked on the family farm while also employed as a journalist for various local newspapers. A Presbyterian, Fleming married Caroline Benn in 1900; together they had one daughter and two sons.

Parliamentary career 
Elected as an independent member for the electoral district of Robertson as a 27-year-old in 1901, Fleming transferred to the seat of Upper Hunter upon the abolition of Robertson in 1904.

Fleming moved to Federal parliament in 1913 as the member for the Division of Robertson, initially as a representative of the Commonwealth Liberal Party, then the Nationalist Party and later the Country Party.

While a member of Federal parliament, Fleming joined the Australian Imperial Force on 6 October 1916 and served as a Driver in the Army Service Corps until his discharge in England on 27 December 1918. He returned to parliament and served until his retirement from politics in 1922. Fleming became an orchardist in Terrigal, New South Wales, where he died in 1961. He was the last surviving MP who served when Joseph Cook was Prime Minister, as well as the last who served during Andrew Fisher's third tenure as PM.

In addition to his parliamentary career, William Fleming wrote poetry, novels and books for children through his lifetime.  His earliest poems appeared in The Queenslander and The Bulletin in 1896 and 1897, and his last children's book was published in 1939.

Bibliography

Novels 

 Where Eagles Build (1925)
 Broad Acres (1939)

Poetry collections 

 War Verses (1915)
 Australia in Peace and War (1917)

Children's 

 Bunyip Says So : A Tale of the Australian Bush (1922)
 Bunyip Told Me (1926)
 The Hunted Piccaninnies (1927)
 Jessie the Elephant : Her Life Story (1939)

References

 

1874 births
1961 deaths
Members of the Australian House of Representatives
Members of the Australian House of Representatives for Robertson
Members of the New South Wales Legislative Assembly
Commonwealth Liberal Party members of the Parliament of Australia
Nationalist Party of Australia members of the Parliament of Australia
National Party of Australia members of the Parliament of Australia
Australian orchardists
Australian male novelists
Australian poets
20th-century Australian politicians
Australian people of Scottish descent
Australian military personnel of World War I